Peter Ross (born 2 September 1992) is a Scottish cricketer. He is a right-handed batsman and a right-arm fast medium bowler. He made his first class debut for Leeds/Bradford MCC University against Yorkshire  on 1 April 2014.

Ross played previously five One day cricket matches for the Scotland national cricket team under-19s team.

In March 2022, Ross was appointed interim head coach of the Scotland women's national cricket team following the resignation of Mark Coles. His appointment was to the end of the 2022 ICC Women's T20 World Cup Qualifier in the United Arab Emirates.

References

External links

1992 births
Living people
Scottish cricketers
Leeds/Bradford MCCU cricketers
Scottish cricket coaches